The Theban Tomb TT60 is located in Sheikh Abd el-Qurna, part of the Theban Necropolis, on the west bank of the Nile, opposite to Luxor. It is the burial place of a woman called Senet. She was related to the ancient Egyptian Vizier Intefiqer (mother or wife). It is one of the earliest burials in the area.

Intefiqer was Governor of the city (i.e. Thebes) and  Vizier of Senusret I in the 12th Dynasty. His tomb's entrance leads into a long corridor, which in turn leads into an inner chamber with a deep niche. From this room a shaft goes down to the actual burial chamber.

In the innermost chapel, Senet is shown in front of an offering table. Other scenes show Intefiqer hunting and there is one (destroyed) scene showing the king Senusret I. The figure of Intefiqer is several times erased.

See also
 List of Theban tombs

References

Bibliography 
 Norman de Garis Davies: The tomb of Antefoker, vizier of Sesostris I, and of his wife, Senet (no. 60), London 1920

External links
Antefoqer and Senet page on Osirisnet.

Theban tombs